Timothy Linh Bui (b. Saigon, South Vietnam, April 13, 1970) is a Vietnamese-born American filmmaker, film producer, and screenwriter. He directed Green Dragon, and co-wrote and produced Three Seasons.

Early life
Bui was born in Saigon, South Vietnam, and came to the United States with his family as a refugee of the Vietnam War in 1975, leaving Vietnam approximately one week before the Fall of Saigon. He grew up in Sunnyvale, California, in the San Francisco Bay Area. His parents held a video store where he watched "thousands" of movies and shot amateur action short films in his parents' backyard.

Bui initially moved to Los Angeles to study in business school, but quickly dropped out to join a film school. He is a graduate of Los Angeles film school, Columbia College Hollywood (CCH).

Timothy Linh Bui is the older brother of Tony Bui, who is also a film director and producer. Bui is also the nephew of the Vietnamese actor Đơn Dương.

Career 
In 1999, Tim Bui co-wrote the film Three Seasons with his brother, the first US-funded production about Vietnam that portrayed the beauty of the country instead of the war horrors of the 1970s. This trip to Vietnam revived his interest for his family's country.

In 2001, he released Green Dragon, which took place in the Vietnamese internment camps in Pendleton, California in 1975.

Patrick Swayze's last film appearance was in Tim Bui's 2009 film Powder Blue.

In 2013, Bui, along with his partner Anh Tran, co-founded the movie production company Happy Canvas Film in the USA. In 2016, he moved Happy Canvas Film to Ho Chi Minh City in Vietnam to develop the film industry in the country. The studio worked on the production of a Vietnamese version of the TV show The Bachelor. In 2018, Bui was part of the production team behind the American remake of his 2016 film The Housemaid.

Filmography

Awards 

 2001: Best Advance Screening for Green Dragon at the Austin Film Festival
 2001: Best Film for Green Dragon at the Humanitas Prize
 1999: Grand Jury Prize, Audience Award, Cinematography for Three Season at the Sundance Film Festival
 2001: Grand Jury Prize for Best Dramatic Film for Green Dragon at the Sundance Film Festival
 2014: Silver Kite Award Best Feature Film for How To Fight in Six Inch Heels (Am Muu Giay Got Nhon) at the Vietnam Awards
 2016: Highest Grossing Vietnamese Horror Film for The Housemaid at the Vietnam Awards
 2017: Silver Lotus Award Best Feature Film for The Housemaid (Co Hau Gai) at the Golden Lotus Film Festival

See also 
 Cinema of Vietnam

References

External links
 
Timothy Linh Bui interview
Timothy Linh Bui interview

1970 births
Living people
People from Ho Chi Minh City
Vietnamese emigrants to the United States
Film producers from California
Vietnamese film directors
American film directors of Vietnamese descent
People from Sunnyvale, California
Film directors from California